Sakhee's Secret (13 March 2004 – 17 November 2021) was a Thoroughbred racehorse. He is owned and bred by octogenarian, Bridget Swire.

Sakhee's Secret defeated older horses to win the 6 furlong July Cup at Newmarket Racecourse which was a key factor in the colt being ranked the World Champion 3-year-old sprinter on turf for 2007.

Sakhee's Secret retired to Whitsbury Manor Stud in 2009.

References
 Sakhee's Secret's pedigree and partial racing stats

2004 racehorse births
2021 racehorse deaths
Racehorses bred in the United Kingdom
Racehorses trained in the United Kingdom
Thoroughbred family 3-d